Garzaneh Chak (also Romanized as Garzaneh Chāk; also known as Gazneh Chāk) is a village in Khorgam Rural District, Khorgam District, Rudbar County, Gilan Province, Iran. At the 2006 census, its population was 17, in 5 families.

References 

Populated places in Rudbar County